W. Hamilton was a college football player.

University of Georgia
He was a prominent tackle for the Georgia Bulldogs football team of the University of Georgia, then considered the best the school had ever boasted at the position.

1899
Hamilton was selected All-Southern in 1899. He enabled the last score in the Clemson game by his work. He was the "superior of any man in the line" in the close loss to North Carolina.

References

American football tackles
Georgia Bulldogs football players
All-Southern college football players
19th-century players of American football